Gibberula moscatellii is a species of very small sea snail, a marine gastropod mollusk or micromollusk in the family Cystiscidae.

Description

Distribution
This species occurs in the Atlantic Ocean off Bahia, Brazil.

References
  Bouchet, P.; Fontaine, B. (2009). List of new marine species described between 2002-2006. Census of Marine Life

moscatellii
Gastropods described in 2004